The Disneyland Resort Paris 15th Anniversary Celebration was a year-long celebration event at the Disneyland Paris holiday resort in Marne-la-Vallée near Paris, France, to mark fifteen years of operation.

The events officially began on 1 April 2007, following a day of press events and premieres on 31 March 2007. The celebration was originally planned to end on 31 March 2008. However, the celebration was extended until 7 March 2009. The celebration was replaced by Mickey's Magical Party from 4 April 2009.

The music used on the advert is the song "Flying" from James Newton Howard's soundtrack of Universal Pictures/Columbia Pictures' 2003 film version of Peter Pan. It is also played during the Candleabration in the park.

Additions

Attractions
 Crush's Coaster
 Cars Quatre Roues Rallye
 The Twilight Zone Tower of Terror
 Stitch Live

Entertainment
 Disney's Once Upon a Dream Parade
 Candleabration
 Disney Characters' Express
 Alpha Bet You Are (2007 Spring and summer only)
 High School Musical On Tour (2007-2008 Spring and summer only)
 Disney Villains' Halloween Showtime (Halloween)
 Enchanted Candleabration (Christmas)
 Minnie's Jolly Holidays Show (Christmas)
 High School Musical 2: School's Out! (2008 Spring and summer only)
 Toon Train: Lights… Camera… Musique! (Spring and summer only)
 Mickey's Not-So-Scary Halloween Parties (Halloween)

Theming projects
 Toon Studio
 Hollywood Boulevard and Vine Street

Shops
 Tower Hotel Gifts
 Disney Fashion

References

External links
Official 15th Anniversary Celebration website

 
Walt Disney Parks and Resorts
Disneyland Paris
Walt Disney Studios Park